The Frank Norris Cabin, also known as Redwood Retreat, was a retreat of the author Frank Norris in the Santa Cruz Mountains near Gilroy, California.  A log cabin, it was only briefly owned by Norris before his untimely death in October 1902.  A circular stone bench, the Frank Norris Memorial, was erected nearby by Fanny Stevenson, a close friend.  It was declared a National Historic Landmark in 1962 for its association with Norris, whose novels McTeague and The Octopus: A Story of California are major American literary works of the turn of the 20th century.

Description
The Frank Norris Cabin is located on a remote parcel of private land in the Santa Cruz Mountains, northwest of Gilroy, accessed via the Redwood Retreat Road and a steep  hiking trail on that property.  It is a single-story log structure with two chambers, and a stone porch.  Located a short distance from the cabin is a semicircular stone bench, in which is mounted a plaque bearing the inscription "FRANK NORRIS, 1870 – 1902. Simpleness and gentleness and honor and clean mirth."

Frank Norris purchased  from the owner of the nearby Redwood Retreat Hotel in the summer of 1902, at which time the cabin was already on the property.  He had been introduced to the area by Fanny Stevenson, who owned a larger tract immediately adjacent.  Norris and his wife Jeannette had spent time on the Stevenson property in 1899, and had become so enamored of the place that he wanted to stay nearby.  He named the property "Quien Sabe" after a retreat so named in The Octopus.  Norris's usage of the property is unclear: he made arrangements to enlarge the cabin, which had only one room when he bought it, but died quite suddenly (of complications from a burst appendix in October 1902.

See also
List of National Historic Landmarks in California
National Register of Historic Places listings in Santa Clara County, California

References

External links

Houses in Santa Clara County, California
Houses on the National Register of Historic Places in California
National Register of Historic Places in Santa Clara County, California
Historic American Buildings Survey in California
Log cabins